Neil Larsen (born August 7, 1948) is an American jazz keyboardist, musical arranger and composer. He was born in Cleveland, Ohio and grew up in Sarasota, Florida before relocating to New York and then, in 1977, Los Angeles.

Early life
Larsen was born in Cleveland, Ohio and grew up in Sarasota, Florida. He learned piano, drawing inspiration from jazz artists John Coltrane, Miles Davis and the Modern Jazz Quartet, and from contemporary rock acts.

In 1969, he was drafted to serve in the Vietnam War. During his time in Vietnam, he worked as a band director, co-ordinating musical entertainment for US armed forces personnel. After his discharge, he moved to New York to work as a musician.

Career
While in New York in the early 1970s, Larsen wrote television jingles and played on sessions for various recording artists. He formed the band Full Moon with jazz guitarist Buzz Feiten, and their self-titled debut album was released in 1972. Larsen was briefly a member of the Soul Survivors. He contributed as  keyboardist, writer and arranger on their 1974 self-titled album on the TSOP label. He began touring as a member of Gregg Allman's band in 1975.

In 1977, Larsen relocated to Los Angeles, where he played on sessions by producers such as Tommy LiPuma, Russ Titelman and Herb Alpert. These projects led to Larsen signing with Alpert's record company, A&M Records, for which he recorded on the Horizon label. Larsen's debut studio album, Jungle Fever, was released in September 1978. Larsen toured the US in support of the release with a band that included Feiten.

The title track from his second studio album, High Gear, was nominated for the 1980 Grammy Award for Best Rock Instrumental Performance. The album peaked at number 153 on the Billboard Top LPs & Tape chart in the US and included musical contributions from Feiten, Michael Brecker, Steve Gadd and Paulinho da Costa.

Larsen collaborated further with Feiten in the jazz–rock fusion group the Larsen-Feiten Band. A self-titled album The Larsen-Feiten Band was released in 1980 on Warner Bros. Records. He has also recorded and toured with guitarist Robben Ford, who contributed to Larsen's 2007 album Orbit.

His compositions have also been recorded by George Benson and Gregg Allman, among others. Larsen took part in Miles Davis's Rubberband sessions in 1985–86, which were later released in 2019. His song "Carnival" was later adapted by Davis into the piece "Carnival Time".

Larsen has worked as a session musician for many rock artists, including Rickie Lee Jones, George Harrison, Kenny Loggins and Don McLean. He was the pianist and musical arranger for the 20th Century Fox Television show Boston Legal, and musical director for jazz singer Al Jarreau.

From 2008, he toured and recorded as a member of Leonard Cohen's band. Larsen performed on Cohen's Old Ideas (2012) album and on the singer's final world tour, in 2012–13. Cohen regularly introduced him on stage as "today's foremost exponent of the Hammond B-3 organ".

Discography 
 Full Moon, Full Moon (Douglas/Epic, 1972)
 Jungle Fever (Horizon/A&M, 1978)
 High Gear (Horizon/A&M, 1979)
 Larsen-Feiten Band (Warner Bros., 1982)
 Full Moon featuring Neil Larsen & Buzz Feiten (Warner Bros., 1982)
 Through Any Window (MCA, 1987)
 Smooth Talk (MCA, 1989)
 Full Moon, Full Moon Live (Dreamsville [Japan], 2002) – live rec. 1980–83
 Orbit (Straight Ahead, 2007)
 Forlana (Portico, 2015)

References

External links
 
 
 

1948 births
Living people
Musicians from Cleveland
people from Sarasota, Florida
American jazz pianists
American male pianists
A&M Records artists
20th-century American pianists
Jazz musicians from Ohio
21st-century American pianists
20th-century American male musicians
21st-century American male musicians
American male jazz musicians